Arnold Rieck (22 June 1876 – 7 November 1924) was a German stage and film actor, humorist, and singer.

Selected filmography
 No Sin on the Alpine Pastures (1915)
 Lehmann's Honeymoon (1916)
 Frau Lenes Scheidung (1917)
 Der Vetter aus Mexiko (1917)
 Der Vorstadt Caruso (1920)
 Killemann hat 'nen Klaps (1920)
 Yvette, the Fashion Princesss (1922)
 Two Worlds (1922)
 The Woman on the Panther (1923)
 Mother and Child (1924)

Bibliography
 Jung, Uli & Schatzberg, Walter. Beyond Caligari: The Films of Robert Wiene. Berghahn Books, 1999.

External links

1876 births
1924 deaths
German male film actors
German male stage actors
German male silent film actors
German humorists
German male singers
German-language singers
Male actors from Berlin
20th-century German male actors